The ATP Montevideo was a men's tennis tournament played in Montevideo, Uruguay.  The event was part of the ATP Tour in 1994 and 1995.  The tournament returned in 1998 as a Challenger event.  It was played in late October/early November on outdoor clay courts.

ATP results

Singles

Doubles

Challenger results

Singles

Doubles

External links
 Results (all) 
 Uruguay open

Montevideo
Montevideo
Montevideo
Montevideo
Recurring sporting events established in 1994
1994 establishments in Uruguay
Sport in Montevideo
Spring (season) events in Uruguay